Sam Longson  (11 April 190017 January 1989) was a British businessman and chairman of Derby County F.C.  Longson founded a road haulage business in Chapel-en-le-Frith that became the largest in Derbyshire. He sold the company by 1967 and also built and sold a hire purchase business. Longson joined the board of directors of Derby County in 1952 and became the chairman in 1966. He was key in bringing Brian Clough to Derby as manager in May 1967, under whose leadership the club won the league in 1972. Clough helped win support to Longson as chairman after he briefly lost the position. Longson's relationship with Clough broke down in 1973 and he accepted Clough's resignation after a disagreement over the manager's media appearances.

Longson appointed Dave Mackay to succeed Clough and the club won the league again in 1975. Longson was appointed an Officer of the Order of the British Empire in the 1977 New Year Honours.  Later that year he disagreed with some directors on the board who advocated for the return of Clough as manager. Longson resigned as chairman on 24 February, though he remained as club president and was a director until May 1980.

Early life and career 
Sam Longson was born into a farming family near Chapel-en-le-Frith in the High Peak district of Derbyshire on 11 April 1900.England & Wales, Civil Registration Death Index, January 1989  He established a haulage company initially using horse-drawn barges on canals, then with steam-powered traction engines and lastly with road lorries.  His firm, Sam Longson Limited, was based in Chapel-en-le-Frith and carried lime for Imperial Chemical Industries.  The company amassed the largest road-haulage fleet in Derbyshire before its sale, in or shortly before 1967, to Thomas Tilling.  Longson also owned a hire purchase company that he sold to the financial services company Leslie and Godwin.

Derby County 
Longson joined the board of Derby County F.C. in 1952 and became chairman in 1966, at which point the manager was Tim Ward.  Longson refused to renew Ward's contract, which expired after five years in May 1967.  Ward had failed to achieve promotion from the Football League Second Division and Longson considered him "too much of a gentleman" to make a success of the job.

Brian Clough era 

While considering who to approach for the Derby County job Longson received a phone call from Len Shackleton, the former England player, who was then a football reporter in North East England.  Shackleton recommended that Longson offer the job to Brian Clough, who was then manager of Fourth Division club Hartlepools United.  Although he preferred candidates with more managerial experience and from better-placed clubs Longson recalled Clough's playing as an active director of other players when he visited the Baseball Ground as part of the Sunderland team.  Longson met with Clough at the Scotch Corner hotel, having travelled from Derby in his Rolls-Royce with three other directors.  Some of the directors considered Clough too "big-headed" for the role but Longson came away from the meeting with a good impression, considering Clough's style a welcome contrast from Ward's more withdrawn personality.

Clough, unusually for the period, had an assistant manager, Peter Taylor and it was agreed both would join Derby.  Longson, who had recently sold his haulage business, agreed to a £5,000 annual salary for Clough and made available £70,000 to fund player transfers.  Derby under Clough were successful, achieving promotion to the First Division in 1969 and winning the league in 1972. Longson lost the chairmanship for part of this period to Sydney Bradley but, with Clough's support, regained it when three directors were forced to resign after the Football Association (FA) imposed a £10,000 fine and a one-year ban from European competition for financial irregularities.

Longson had a close relationship with Clough and initially viewed him almost as a son.  The pair had fallings out over Clough's decisions to hire a secretary and agree transfers for Colin Todd (from Sunderland in 1971 for £175,000) and Roger Davies (from Worcester City in the same year for £14,000).  When Clough's initial contract ran out in 1972 negotiations to extend it overran and almost resulted in him leaving Derby, though an agreement was reached by the end of the year.  Clough's drinking became problematic and there were arguments at the start of the 1972–73 season when the board of directors emptied and locked the club's drinks cabinet.  Longson was forced to apologise to the club's fans after Clough publicly insulted them after a September game against Liverpool.  There were also disputes over Clough's frequent media appearances.  Longson was initially supportive of Clough's approach, thinking the publicity was good for the club but later changed his mind.  When Longson visited other football clubs he was taunted with questions asking who really ran Derby County, him or Clough.  Longson made a demand that Clough send him copies of his newspaper columns before they were published; Clough was outraged.  Clough wanted to eject Longson as chairman but failed to win sufficient support from the rest of the board.  Clough accepted an additional presenting role on ITV that Longson complained was negatively affecting his performance as manager.  Clough and Taylor sent in their resignations over the matter, expecting that Longson would back down.

Taylor later recalled that Longson left him and Clough waiting outside his office when he called them in to discuss their resignation letters.  When Longson called them in he accepted their resignations and told them they would receive no compensation from the club.  When leaving Taylor was called back and Longson offered him the manager's job, which Taylor refused on principle.  Clough and Taylor were told to hand over the keys to their company cars, which they refused to do.  Taylor claimed that the club cancelled their insurance and reported them to the police after they left but they escaped a fine after a tip-off from a friendly policeman.

Post-Clough era 
In the days around Clough's departure there was much press interest at the Baseball Ground.  Residents moved their dining tables to their front windows to keep an eye on the comings and goings and Longson stayed in a nearby hotel, from where he gave impromptu press conferences while dressed in his pyjamas. Longson had the club's trainer Jimmy Gordon act as manager in the first games following Clough's departure. The first match, a 2–1 defeat of Leicester City on 20 October, was attended by Clough on a borrowed season ticket and he sat yards away from Longson. Taylor recalls Clough received huge applause from the crowd that Longson attempted to upstage by waving his arms from the director's box.

Longson appointed former player Dave Mackay as Clough's permanent replacement. The club, under Mackay, won the league again in 1974–75.  By 1976 Longson was in the unusual position of having  a grandson who was also chairman of a football club.  That year he confirmed his opposition to the formation of a breakaway "super league" by some clubs in the FA (the Premier League would not be formed until 1992) and to bringing in more money from television rights or negotiations with the football pools.

Longson was appointed an Officer of the Order of the British Empire in the 1977 New Year Honours, by which time he was also Derby's club president.  Longson was due to retire as chairman in summer that year.  At the start of 1977 relations between the chairman and a faction of the board that wanted the return of Clough were acrimonious.  Longson stormed out of a 21 February board meeting and declared he would resign, proceeding around the ground, bidding farewell to staff.  He actually resigned on 24 February following a long board meeting that reporters speculated was a power struggle between Longson and George Hardy.  Longson left partway through the meeting and would be replaced as chairman by Hardy.  Longson remained a director and club president.  Longson resigned from the Derby County board in May 1980 and died in Buxton on 17 January 1989.  He was portrayed by Jim Broadbent in the 2009 film The Damned United, a fictional account of Clough's departure from Derby and his brief stint as manager of Leeds United.

References 

1900 births
1989 deaths
People from Chapel-en-le-Frith
British businesspeople in transport
British financial businesspeople
Chairmen and investors of football clubs in England
Officers of the Order of the British Empire